Harold Owen Luder  (7 August 1928 – 8 October 2021) was a British architect who designed a number of notable and sometimes controversial buildings in the United Kingdom in the 1960s and 1970s, many now demolished. He served as chairman of the Architects Registration Board and twice as President of the Royal Institute of British Architects in 1981–1983 and 1995–1997. He established his own practice Owen Luder Partnership in 1957, and left in 1987 to form the consultancy Communication In Construction.

Early life and career
Luder was born in London in 1928, the son of an unknown father and Ellen Clara Mason, who married Edward Charles Luder in 1931.  He grew up on the Old Kent Road in south London. As a boy he wanted to design aircraft but after the Second World War decided to become an architect, and trained at the Brixton School of Building. In 1945, he joined the practice of architect Henry C. Smith, before being called up for military service.  

In the early and mid-1950s, he worked for several small architectural practices, as well as undertaking private work. He set up his own practice, Owen Luder Partnership, in 1957.

Works

Buildings 

 Hendon Hall Court, London, England. (1963)
 Eros House, London, England. (1965)
 Tricorn Centre, Portsmouth, England. (1966) - Demolished in 2004
 Trinity Square, Gateshead, England. (1967) - Demolished in 2010
 Consort House, London, England. (1970)
 SouthGate Shopping Centre, Bath, England. (1971) - Demolished in 2007
 Derwent Tower, Gateshead, England. (1972) - Demolished in 2012
 Catford Shopping Centre, London, England. (1974)
 Milford Towers, London, England. (1974)

Luder's designs included some of the most powerful and raw examples of Brutalist architecture, with massive bare concrete sculptural forms devoid of claddings or decoration – other than their inherent shapes. The British climate, with abundant rain and damp winters, is unkind to such unclad concrete buildings, which rapidly become a shabby grey–brown colour and streaked with marks where rainwater has run down the façades. Poor maintenance has often exacerbated these problems.

Some of the Owen Luder Partnership's (OLP) best known buildings are the Tricorn Centre in Portsmouth, Derwent Tower in Gateshead, and Catford Shopping Centre in London. Trinity Square in Gateshead (whose multi-storey car park featured in the 1971 gangster film Get Carter) was another one of the practice's major schemes, demolition of which began in July 2010. Luder also designed the much-derided Southgate shopping centre in Bath, Somerset, which was demolished in 2007 to make way for a new multimillion-pound development.

Despite receiving awards when built, the Tricorn Centre was voted the third ugliest building in Britain and was demolished in 2004 to mixed reactions and protests from an unrepentant Luder. The Trinity Square car park has also been subject to a number of redevelopment proposals and featured in the Channel 4 series Demolition in 2005. Luder was later given a Rubble Club award for having the best building to be demolished during the architect's lifetime.

Luder featured in the 2005 BBC Radio 3 broadcast Gateshead Multi-Storey Car Park. A radiophonic tribute to Trinity Square, produced by Langham Research Centre, the programme was made entirely from the sounds of the carpark, processed and treated on quarter-inch tape.

Luder also designed the conversion of a Victorian fire station into the South London Theatre in 1967. In addition he designed a number of small houses in the borough of Lambeth including 26–28 Groveway (1953) and 76–78 Herne Hill Road (1954), one of the latter was occupied by Luder upon completion.

Some of the less controversial OLP buildings have escaped attention and many are conceptual, innovative, and thoughtful schemes that respond effectively to place while bringing a visible structured order to a building. This is often manifested by complex staircases, strong vertical and horizontal articulation, bespoke window design, and spatial volumes punctuating the external form of the building. In their housing and mixed use developments, for example, they display a consistent formal language and many continue to be well used to the present. Examples of these include Harrogate House, Harrogate (1963), Hendon Hall Court in North London (1963), and 16 Grand Avenue in Hove (1965).

The OLP built many buildings around South London, where Luder lived for some time, but also much wider in the UK. The OLP also developed unbuilt schemes for Nigeria, Belgium, Saudi Arabia, and Greece where partnership practices were started. Indeed The OLP's work is deserving of re-evaluation. He is labelled as a brutalist architect but his work is far more extensive, subtle, and influential than that term dictates. His architectural vision is akin to contemporary architects such as Norman Foster and Zaha Hadid and his innovative approach to a wide range of architectural briefs - both social and commercial - may well have set an example for them to follow.

Trinity Square in Gateshead was demolished in 2010, and Derwent Tower in 2012. The Catford Centre, Luder's last surviving town centre of the Tricorn type, was purchased by the local council in 2010 for "regeneration", which may involve demolition of the housing on the site. Roxby House in Sidcup survives as an example of his later work.

National Life Stories conducted an oral history interview (C467/128) with Owen Luder in 2015-16 for its Architects Lives' collection held by the British Library.

Death
Luder died on 8 October 2021, at the age of 93.

See also
Rodney Gordon, design director at Owen Luder Partnership.

References

External links

1928 births
2021 deaths
20th-century English architects
Brutalist architects
Commanders of the Order of the British Empire
Presidents of the Royal Institute of British Architects
Architects from London